Leaf protein concentrate (LPC) is a concentrated form of the proteins found in the leaves of plants.  It has been examined as a human or animal food source, because it is potentially the cheapest, most abundant source of available protein.  Although humans can derive some protein from the direct consumption of leafy vegetables, the human digestive system would not be able to deal with the enormous bulk of leaves needed to meet dietary protein requirements with leaf vegetables alone.

Composition 
Whole leaf protein concentrate is a dark green substance with a texture similar to cheese. Approximately 60% of this is water, while the remaining dry matter is 9-11% nitrogen, 20-25% lipid, 5-10% starch and a variable amount of ash. It is a mixture of many individual proteins. Its flavour has been compared to spinach or tea.

Because the colour and taste may make it unpalatable for humans, LPC can instead be separated into green and white fractions. The green fraction has proteins mainly originating from the chloroplasts, while the white fraction has proteins mainly originating from the cytoplasm.

Applications 
LPC was first suggested as a human food in the early 20th century, but it has not achieved much success, despite early promise. Norman Pirie, the Copley Medal winner from the UK, studied LPC and promoted its use for human consumption. He and his team developed machines for extraction of LPC, including low-maintenance "village units" intended for poor rural communities. These were installed in places such as villages in south India. 

The increasing reliance on feedlot based animal rearing to satisfy human appetites for meat has increased demand for cheaper vegetable protein sources. This has recently led to renewed interest in LPC to reduce the use of human-edible vegetable protein sources in animal feed.

Leaf protein has had successful trials as a substitute for soy feed for chickens and pigs.

LPC from alfalfa can be included in feed for tilapia as a partial replacement for fish meal.

Dietary issues
Leaf protein is a good source of amino acids, with methionine being a limiting factor. It is nutritionally better than seed proteins and comparable to animal proteins (other than those in egg and milk).

In terms of digestibility, whole LPC has digestibility in the range 65–90%. The green fraction has a much lower digestibility that may be <50%, while the white fraction has digestibility >90%.

The challenges that have to be overcome using lucerne and cassava, two high density monoculture crops, include the high fiber content and other antinutritional factors, such as phytate, cyanide, and tannins.

Lablab beans, Moringa oleifera, tree collards and bush clover may also be used. Flavors of different species vary greatly.

Methods of production
Generally, LPC is produced by pulping leaves and pressing the juice out, heating the juice to coagulate the protein, and filtering the protein out and drying it. To obtain the green and white fractions separately, two-step heat coagulation is the usual method: heating to approximately 60 °C coagulates the green protein, then heating to 80 °C coagulates the white protein. Alternative methods that have been proposed include flocculation using polyelectrolytes, ultrafiltration and ultracentrifugation.

See also 
Protein (nutrient)
Tofu

References

Bibliography

External links 

 Leaf for Life, organization

Nutrition
Meat substitutes
Vegetarianism
Leaves
Proteins
Perennial protein crops